Howard Allan Stern (born January 12, 1954) is an American radio and television personality, comedian, and author. He is best known for his radio show, The Howard Stern Show, which gained popularity when it was nationally syndicated on terrestrial radio from 1986 to 2005. He has broadcast on Sirius XM Radio since 2006.

Stern landed his first radio jobs while at Boston University. From 1976 to 1982, he developed his on-air personality through morning positions at WRNW in Briarcliff Manor, New York; WCCC in Hartford, Connecticut; WWWW in Detroit, Michigan; and WWDC in Washington, D.C. He worked afternoons at WNBC in New York City from 1982 until his firing in 1985. In 1985, he began a 20-year run at WXRK in New York City; his morning show entered syndication in 1986 and aired in 60 markets and attracted 20 million listeners at its peak. In recent years, Stern's photography has been featured in Hamptons and WHIRL magazines. From 2012 to 2015, he served as a judge on America's Got Talent.

Stern has won numerous industry awards, including Billboards Nationally Syndicated Air Personality of the Year eight consecutive times, and he is the first to have the number one morning show in New York City and Los Angeles simultaneously. He became the most fined radio host when the Federal Communications Commission issued fines totaling $2.5 million to station owners for content it deemed indecent. Stern became one of the highest-paid radio figures after signing a five-year deal with Sirius in 2004 worth $500 million.

Stern has described himself as the "King of All Media" since 1992 for his successes outside radio. He hosted and produced numerous late-night television shows, pay-per-view events, and home videos. Two of his books, Private Parts (1993) and Miss America (1995), entered The New York Times Best Seller list at number one and sold over one million copies. The former was made into a biographical comedy film in 1997 that had Stern and his radio show staff star as themselves. It topped the US box office in its opening week and grossed $41.2 million domestically. Stern performs on its soundtrack, which charted the Billboard 200 at number one and was certified platinum for one million copies sold. Stern's third book, Howard Stern Comes Again, was released in 2019.

Early life and education
Howard Allan Stern was born on January 12, 1954, the second child of Ben (1923–2022) and Ray (née Schiffman) Stern (b. 1927), in the Jackson Heights neighborhood of Queens in New York City. Stern's parents are Jewish, and their families are from Poland and Austria-Hungary. Ray was an office clerk in New York City before she became a homemaker and later took up work as an inhalation therapist. Ben served in the U.S. Army on Long Island and in California during the war. He later worked as a radio engineer at WHOM in Manhattan and as a co-owner and operator at Aura Recording Inc., a Manhattan recording studio where cartoons and commercials were cut. Stern described his older sister Ellen as the "complete opposite" of himself and "very quiet".

In 1955, the family moved to Roosevelt, New York, on Long Island, where Stern attended Washington-Rose Elementary School followed by Roosevelt Junior-Senior High School. Stern also attended Hebrew school where he was given the name Tzvi. As a youngster Stern took five years of piano lessons and took an interest in marionettes, using them to entertain his friends with explicit shows. He formed a band with two school friends, the Electric Comicbook, on vocals and keyboards. From the age of nine to his second year at university, Stern spent his summers at Camp Wel-Met, a youth camp in Narrowsburg, New York where he worked camper, kitchen, and counselor duties. He recalled his time there as "the greatest experience".

Stern wished to be in radio at the age of five. He was an infrequent listener in his youth, but names talk personalities Bob Grant and Brad Crandall as early influences. His father set up a microphone, tape machine and turntable in the basement of his home which Stern used to record his make-believe radio shows, incorporating different characters and pre-recorded prank calls, sketches, and commercials. He made several visits to his father's recording studio and witnessed "some of the great voice guys" work with him, including Don Adams and Larry Storch voice Tennessee Tuxedo and His Tales, which began his desire to be on the air and "do a show", rather than play records.

In the late 1960s, Roosevelt became a predominantly black area; Stern remembered just "a handful of white kids" had remained in his school and repeated instances of bullying from black students. In June 1969, the family moved to nearby Rockville Centre, and Stern, at age fifteen, transferred to South Side High School where he became "a total introvert". He graduated from the school in 1972; his yearbook lists Stern's sole student activity, a membership of Key Club.

In 1972, Stern declined a place at Elmira College to instead pursue a Communications degree at Boston University, but his average high school grades caused him to spend the first two years in its College of Basic Studies. In his second year, he started work at the campus radio station WTBU, where he played records, read the news, and hosted interview programs. With three fellow students, he later co-hosted a weekly comedy show named The King Schmaltz Bagel Hour, which was initially canceled during its first broadcast for a racial sketch named "Godzilla Goes to Harlem". Stern took cannabis, Quaaludes, and LSD during his studies, but he quit after he experienced a difficult trip on too much LSD. 

In 1974, he gained admission to the university's School of Public Communications. He then studied for a diploma at the Radio Engineering Institute of Electronics in Fredericksburg, Virginia, in July 1975, which earned him a first-class radio-telephone operator license, a required certificate for all radio broadcasters at the time, which was issued by the Federal Communications Commission. With the license, Stern landed his first professional radio job at WNTN in Newton, Massachusetts from August to December 1975 doing air shifts, news casting, and production work. For the next five months, he taught students basic electronics in preparation for their own FCC exams. 

In May 1976, Stern graduated magna cum laude with a 3.8-grade point average. His major was broadcasting and film and his minor English and speech. In the past, he funded a scholarship at the university.

Career

1976–1981: WRNW, WCCC, and WWWW
In his search for radio work following his graduation, Stern took up an offer to work evenings at WRNW, a progressive rock station in Briarcliff Manor, New York. He was unsure of his talent and questioned his future as a professional in the industry, writing "I freaked out. I got real nervous that I wasn't good enough". Stern accepted a marketing role at Benton & Bowles, a New York advertising agency, which he soon "quit without giving notice" in favor of a position in the creative department. He lasted three hours before he was fired "because their personnel department realized that I was the guy who just quit". Stern then worked in Queens as a radio salesman selling advertising time without considerable success. He wrote, "All of a sudden ... I realized I had turned down a job in radio". With encouragement from his mother and girlfriend, Stern contacted WRNW for work and agreed to take cover shifts surrounding the Christmas holidays in 1976. Impressed with his reliability and professional approach, the station's director hired Stern full-time for a four-hour midday shift for six days a week, for $96 a week. After several months, Stern became the station's production director, which lasted until November 1977 when he became its program director for an increased salary of $250 a week. To save money, Stern rented a room in a monastery in Armonk, New York.

In 1979, Stern spotted an advertisement in Radio & Records for a "wild, fun morning guy" at rock station WCCC in Hartford, Connecticut. He used some morning air time to assemble an aircheck with more outrageous bits, including Robert Klein and Cheech and Chong records with added flatulence routines and one-liners. Stern was hired for the same salary but worked a more intense schedule. After four hours on the air, he voiced and produced commercials for another four. On Saturdays, following a six-hour show, he did production work for the next three. He also completed duties as the station's public affairs director and hosted a Sunday morning talk show that he favored above playing records, as it "represented what I wanted to do on the radio more than anything. Take the average guy and dissect what he does". In the summer of the 1979 energy crisis, Stern urged listeners to a two-day boycott of Shell Oil Company, a stunt that attracted media attention. It was at WCCC where Stern first met Fred Norris, the overnight disc jockey, who went on to become Stern's writer and producer since 1981. Stern left WCCC in early 1980 after he was denied a "lousy, stinking twenty-five-dollar-a-week raise". At the same time, local rival station WHCN had assembled tapes and press clippings of Stern and forwarded them to Burkhart/Abrams, a radio consulting firm, to get Stern out of the Hartford market as a rise in his ratings increased his threat to the station's numbers. The tapes were received by Dwight Douglas, a consultant at Burkhart/Abrams, who offered Stern work in Columbus, Ohio, but Stern declined.

In his search for new work, Stern found an advertised position in Radio & Records for a morning host at WWWW, a struggling rock station in Detroit, Michigan. His aircheck was well received by management who made an offer, but Douglas advised Stern against the move and suggested he wait for an offer from a better station. Stern went ahead regardless and accepted a deal, starting on April 21, 1980. He thought of new ways to improve his show and to be more open on the air, "to cut down the barriers ... strip down all the ego ... and be totally honest". His efforts paid off with his first industry recognition, winning a Billboard Award for Album-Oriented Rock Personality of the Year For a Major Market and the debut Top Five Talent Search contest in the album-oriented rock category from radio syndication firm Drake-Chenault, which then distributed the winning radio segments to stations across the country. Despite the success, WWWW continued to decline in the ratings and failed to overtake the three more popular rock stations in the area. The quarterly Arbitron ratings released in January 1981 showed no signs of a strong audience, causing the station to change formats overnight from rock to country music, to Stern's surprise and annoyance. He lasted another two weeks before "it was time to hit the road again. Somehow, I couldn't see myself as Hopalong Howie". He declined offers to work at WXRT in Chicago and CHUM in Toronto, Ontario, Canada.

1981–1985: WWDC and WNBC
Douglas found Stern's next job, hosting mornings at album-oriented rock station WWDC in Washington, D.C. Stern was cautious about the offer at first as the general manager "was not really aware of what I did," but he accepted the offer and started on March 2, 1981. During his time relocating from Detroit, Stern spent several weeks planning out a new show, determined to become more successful as the station presented a good chance for him to work in New York City, his career goal. He was determined to "kill my competition. I was going to say whatever the fuck I was going to say ... The first step was to put my team together". He sought a co-host with a sense of humor to riff with on news and current events. The station then paired Stern with Robin Quivers, a former nurse in the air force and news reporter at WFBR in Baltimore. Quivers was sent a tape of Stern interviewing a prostitute on the air, and she accepted the job without meeting him. She assumed she "would come in and do the news ... but it wasn't that way". Despite several issues management had over content, which led to the installation of a seven-second delay to censor questionable moments, Stern "kept chipping away at management's archaic approach, and we began to assemble the program I had envisioned", which included the addition of Norris as his writer and producer. In one incident, Stern revealed his wife's miscarriage on the air. In January 1982, Stern had the second-highest-rated morning show in the city.

Impressed with his rapid rise in the ratings, WWDC management offered Stern an initial one-year extension to his contract, but Stern wished for a more long-term deal. At the same time, he was offered a five-year deal worth $1 million to work afternoons at WNBC in New York City, then an adult contemporary station, after radio manager Jerry Nachman became a fan of Stern and suggested his name to the station. Stern signed with WNBC in March 1982, four months before his contract with WWDC was to expire. His relationship with station management declined from then on, and he repeatedly criticized them and other deejays on the air, including an incident when he revealed the manager's salary. The situation culminated on June 25, 1982, when Stern was terminated from the station. Towards the end of his stay, Stern had more than tripled his ratings since he began, and The Washingtonian named him the city's best disc jockey. It was often believed that Stern was suspended over a controversial bit regarding the 1982 crash of Air Florida Flight 90 that made people believe he had called the airline and asked for prices to the 14th Street bridge, the site of the crash, and if it would be a "regular stop". But Stern said it was false, claiming "no one ever complained about it". In his last few months, Stern secured a $35,000 advance deal with Wren Records to produce a comedy album of song parodies with Norris, titled 50 Ways to Rank Your Mother. It was reissued in 1994 as Unclean Beaver.

In April 1982, four months before he started at WNBC, NBC Magazine aired a critical news report on shock radio by Douglas Kiker that centered around Stern and the controversial nature of his show. The piece caused NBC executives to discuss the potential withdrawal of Stern's contract, but, rather than spend money on buying Stern out of the deal, management agreed to control Stern. To make matters worse, the station did not allow Stern to bring his show partners at first, which caused some friction between Stern and Quivers for several months. Stern began his afternoon show at WNBC on August 30, 1982, and was closely monitored, instructed to avoid discussions of a sexual or religious nature. In his first month, he was suspended for "Virgin Mary Kong", a sketch about a video game where a group of men pursued the Virgin Mary around a singles bar in Jerusalem. The station then hired an attorney to operate a seven-second delay if Stern said something potentially offensive. This soon became the task of program director Kevin Metheny, who Stern infamously feuded with and nicknamed "Pig Virus". While at WNBC, Stern also began his longtime feud with its morning host Don Imus.

In 1984, Stern acquired Don Buchwald as his agent, who supervised Stern's new three-year contract with WNBC in early 1985. His popularity with the audience grew despite management's continual restrictions. On May 21, 1984, he made his debut appearance on Late Night with David Letterman and was featured in People magazine, increasing his national exposure. Around this time Stern appeared in the low budget comedy film Ryder, P.I. (1986) as Ben Wah, an out of control newscaster, for which he was paid $1,000. In May 1985, Stern claimed the highest ratings at WNBC in four years with a 5.7% market share of the afternoon audience. In a sudden turn of events, Stern and Quivers were fired shortly before they were to go on air on September 30, 1985, for what WNBC management termed "conceptual differences" regarding the show. Program director John Hayes explained: "Over the course of time we made a very conscious effort to make Stern aware that certain elements of the program should be changed ... I don't think it's appropriate to say what those specifics were". Stern was not told whose decision it was. In 1992, he believed Thornton Bradshaw, chairman of WNBC owner RCA, heard his "Bestiality Dial-a-Date" segment that aired ten days before his suspension and ordered the show's cancellation.

1985–1993: WXRK and early television and video projects
After his firing from WNBC, Stern kept in touch with his audience by booking dates at clubs with a live stage show. He declined offers to work in Los Angeles, including NBC's offer of $50,000 if he accepted the move, but chose to stay in New York to "kick NBC's ass". In a press conference held in October 1985, Stern announced the signing of a five-year contract with Infinity Broadcasting worth an estimated $500,000 to host afternoons on its rock music station WXRK from November 18. WNBC agreed to let Stern out of his contract. Otherwise, the station was obliged to pay him for the remainder of his deal. Determined to beat Imus and WNBC in the ratings, Stern moved to the prime time morning slot in February 1986. The show entered syndication on August 18 that year when WYSP in Philadelphia began to simulcast the program. In the New York market, Stern had the highest-rated morning radio program between 1994 and 2001. During Stern's twenty years at WXRK, his show was syndicated in 60 markets across North America and gained a peak audience of 20 million listeners.

Stern's first venture into television began when the Fox network sought a replacement for The Late Show, a late-night talk show hosted by Joan Rivers. Following discussions with the network that began in late 1986, Stern agreed to five one-hour pilots that were produced for an estimated $400,000, with guitarist Leslie West as his band leader and comedian Steve Rossi as the show's announcer. The show was subject to screen tests among focus groups in California, after which Fox decided not to pick it up. One Fox executive described the pilots as "poorly produced", "in poor taste", and "boring". Stern went on to host his first pay-per-view event, Howard Stern's Negligeé and Underpants Party, in February 1988. The special was purchased in 60,000 homes and grossed $1.2 million. After Stern joked about drugs being used backstage at the show, Michael Levine of the Drug Enforcement Administration complained to the Daily News which sparked media attention, though no investigation was made. In October 1989, fans sold out Nassau Coliseum in four hours for Howard Stern's U.S. Open Sores, a live event that featured a tennis match between Stern and his producer Gary Dell'Abate following an on-air challenge. Stern released both events for home video.

In its 1990 feature on Stern, Rolling Stone predicted he was "on the fast track to multimedia stardom". He re-signed with Infinity Broadcasting that year to continue his radio show for five years, a deal that New York Magazine estimated was worth over $10 million. In July 1990, Stern became the host of the Saturday night variety television show The Howard Stern Show on WWOR-TV, starring himself and his radio show staff. Initially produced as four, one-hour specials and broadcast during the summer, the show continued to air and entered syndication in 1991 to a peak of 65 markets across the country, including cities where the radio show did not air. In the New York area, the show frequently beat Saturday Night Live in the ratings during the thirty minutes when the two overlapped. Stern ended the program after 69 episodes, in 1992.

By this time, the radio show had been the subject of several fines issued by the Federal Communications Commission (FCC) over material it deemed indecent. As part of his rally against the FCC's actions, Stern released a compilation album of censored radio segments titled Crucified by the FCC in early 1991.

Stern's rise as a popular radio and television figure in 1992 led to the first instance of his self-proclaimed title "King of All Media". This was initially a tongue-in-cheek jab at Michael Jackson, who had been dubbed "King of Pop". In October 1992, Stern became the first to have the number one morning radio show in the New York and Los Angeles markets simultaneously. In the same month, Stern released Butt Bongo Fiesta, a home video containing the highlight feature of "butt bongoing", an act Stern described as "frenetic spanking in time to a rock record playing in the background". The video was a commercial success; approximately 260,000 copies were sold for a gross of over $10 million. In November 1992, Stern returned to Saturday night television as the host of The Howard Stern "Interview", a weekly one-on-one celebrity interview series on the E! network which ended in 1993. Stern appeared at the 1992 MTV Video Music Awards as Fartman, a fictional superhero originating from the humor magazine National Lampoon. Presenting an award with Luke Perry, Stern appeared on stage in the Fartman costume with his buttocks exposed. According to the trademark Stern filed for the character in October 1992, he first used Fartman at WWDC in July 1981. Development for The Adventures of Fartman, a feature film based around the character, began in late 1992 with Stern reaching a verbal agreement with New Line Cinema to release it. Screenwriter J. F. Lawton was hired to prepare an outline to a script and to direct the film with producer David Permut, and it received a budget of $8–11 million. Lawton described the film as "a real comedy with a beginning, middle and an end with a strong story". In 1993, the project was abandoned due to disagreements between Stern and New Line regarding the film's content, rating, and merchandising rights.

In November 1993, Stern was again in talks with Fox to host a late-night talk show, this time replacing Chevy Chase, whose show had been cancelled in October of that year.

1993–1994: Private Parts and run for Governor of New York
After The Adventures of Fartman was shelved, Buchwald started to pitch deals with book publishers as "there was a perception that [Stern] had taken a hit ... we thought of the book as something that would both produce income and suggest to people that Howard had economic clout". In early 1993, Stern signed a deal with Simon & Schuster worth around $1 million to write his first book, Private Parts. He spent the summer writing it with collaborator Larry "Ratso" Sloman and editor Judith Regan, calling the experience "the most challenging thing I have ever done in my career". Upon its release on October 7, 1993, Private Parts was an immediate commercial success. The entire first print of 225,000 copies sold within hours. In five days, it became the fastest selling title in the history of Simon & Schuster. Over one million copies were distributed after two weeks. Private Parts entered The New York Times Best-Seller list at number one and stayed on the list for 20 weeks. Stern held book signings across the country, with sessions lasting as long as seven hours. The first, held in New York City, was attended by an estimated ten thousand people.

In its twentieth anniversary issue in 1993, Radio & Records named Stern "the most influential air personality of the past two decades". In February 1994, Stern was featured in Rolling Stone magazine for his first of three cover stories. That year, Billboard magazine added the Nationally Syndicated Air Personality of the Year category to its annual awards, based on "entertainment value, creativity, and ratings success"; Stern was awarded the title each year from 1994 to 2002. In late 1993, Stern urged his listeners to elect Christine Todd Whitman as Governor of New Jersey after Stern promised to support the first candidate to phone in his radio show. In March 1995, following her election success, Whitman named a highway rest stop after Stern in exchange for his endorsement on Interstate 295, south of Trenton, New Jersey. A $1,000 plaque was installed at the stop, which was stolen days later and mailed to Stern. The rest area closed in 2003 as part of budget cuts by Governor Jim McGreevey.

Stern held his second pay-per-view special, The Miss Howard Stern New Year's Eve Pageant, on December 31, 1993. The show centered around a mock beauty pageant with celebrity judges to crown the first "Miss Howard Stern". An estimated 400,000 households purchased the show for a gross of $16 million, breaking the subscriber record for a non-sports event held by a New Kids on the Block concert in 1990. The New York Post called it "The most disgusting two hours in the history of television". The show was released for home video in early 1994, entitled Howard Stern's New Year's Rotten Eve 1994. It cost Stern a second television deal with Fox after network executives had disliked the content of the event and ceased discussions.

During his radio show on March 22, 1994, Stern announced his candidacy for Governor of New York under the Libertarian Party ticket, challenging Mario Cuomo for re-election. Stern planned to reinstate the death penalty, remove highway tolls to improve traffic flow and limit road work to graveyard shifts hours. Stern announced that once those three goals were accomplished, he would resign and pass the governorship to his lieutenant. At the party's nomination convention on April 23, Stern won the required two-thirds majority on the first ballot, receiving 287 of the 381 votes cast; James Ostrowski finished second with 34 votes. To place his name on the final ballot, Stern was obliged to state his home address and complete a financial disclosure form under the Ethics in Government Act. Stern applied for an injunction as he wished to avoid stating his income; the request was denied by a judge on August 2. Stern withdrew his candidacy in an on-air press conference two days later, saying: "I spend 25 hours a week telling you all the most intimate details of my life ... One fact I've never revealed is how much I make and how much money I have ... it's none of your business". In the gubernatorial election on November 8, Cuomo was defeated by George Pataki, whom Stern backed. In August 1995, Pataki signed a bill that limited construction on state roads to night hours in New York City and Long Island, which was named the "Howard Stern Bill" in honor of Stern originally proposing the plan. Stern has since felt "firmly opposed" to the death penalty.

In June 1994, Stern founded the Howard Stern Production Company for "original film and television production enterprises as well as joint production and development ventures". He intended to assist in a feature film adaptation of Brother Sam, the biography of comedian Sam Kinison written by his brother. In the same month, the E! network began to air weekday highlights from Stern's radio show using cameras installed in the studio. Howard Stern ran for eleven years; the last original episode aired on July 8, 2005.

1995–1997: Miss America and Private Parts film
On April 3, 1995, three days after the shooting of singer Selena, Stern's comments regarding her death and Mexican Americans caused controversy among his listeners in Texas and some Mexican-American communities. Among his criticisms of her music, sound effects of gunfire were played: "This music does absolutely nothing for me. Alvin and the Chipmunks have more soul ... Spanish people have the worst taste in music. They have no depth". After three days of widespread media reaction and boycott threats, Stern responded with a statement in Spanish, stressing his comments were made in satire and were not intended to hurt those who loved her. The next day, Eloy Cano, a Justice of the Peace of Harlingen, Texas, issued an arrest warrant on Stern for disorderly conduct that carried a potential maximum fine of $500 if he entered the state. Stern was never arrested on the warrant.

In 1995, Stern signed an advance deal with ReganBooks worth around $3 million to write his second book, Miss America. Stern wrote about various topics, including his cybersex experiences on the Internet service Prodigy, a private meeting with Michael Jackson, his suffering with back pain and obsessive–compulsive disorder, and his run for Governor of New York. Following its release on November 7, 1995, Miss America sold 33,000 copies at Barnes & Noble stores which set a new one-day record for the chain, and 120,000 in its first week. It entered The New York Times Best-Seller list at number one and stayed on the list for 16 weeks. According to Publishers Weekly, 1.39 million copies were sold in 1995 alone which ranked it the year's third best-selling book. As with Private Parts, Stern's book signings attracted thousands. His November 30, 1995, appearance on The Tonight Show with Jay Leno caused controversy after he appeared on the show with two bikini-clad women who kissed each other and received spanks from Stern. Leno, who urged that both acts would be edited out from the final broadcast, walked off the stage after the segment without thanking Stern.

In February 1996, production began on a biographical comedy film adaptation of Private Parts for Paramount Pictures. Development had lasted over two years as Stern, who had final script approval, "rejected every script there was ... they were over the top comedies that I think were dumb, boring and dull". After producer Ivan Reitman got involved with the project, Stern agreed to a script developed by Len Blum and Michael Kalesniko. Filming began in May 1996 with director Betty Thomas and lasted four months with Stern, Quivers, and Norris acting as their younger and current selves. The crew traveled to the film set after each radio show and stayed there to shoot on weekends. Stern embarked on an extensive publicity tour to promote the film which included numerous television appearances and magazine interviews in his attempt to appeal to people who were not listeners of his radio show. Private Parts premiered on February 27, 1997, at The Theater at Madison Square Garden; outside the theatre, Stern and Rob Zombie performed "The Great American Nightmare", a track they recorded for its soundtrack. The film's wide release followed on March 7, 1997. It topped the US box office in its opening weekend with a gross of $14.6 million and earned a domestic total of $41.2 million. In 1998, Stern received a Blockbuster Entertainment Award for Favorite Male Newcomer. The soundtrack, Private Parts: The Album, sold 178,000 copies in its first week of release and entered the Billboard 200 chart in the United States at number one in March 1997, the highest selling debut release for a soundtrack to a feature film. Three months after its release, the album was certified platinum by the Recording Industry Association of America for shipping one million copies. Stern also provides vocals on "Tortured Man", a track he recorded with The Dust Brothers.

In October 1997, Stern filed a $1.5 million lawsuit against Ministry of Film Inc., claiming the studio recruited him for a film called Jane starring Melanie Griffith while knowing it had insufficient funds. Stern, who remained unpaid when production ceased, accused the studio of breach of contract, fraud, and negligent representation. A settlement was reached in 1999 which resulted in Stern receiving $50,000.

1998–2004: Television and film projects
In April 1998, Stern announced his return to Saturday night television after he signed a deal with CBS to compete with Saturday Night Live on NBC and MADtv on Fox. His show, The Howard Stern Radio Show, an hour-long program that aired on mostly CBS affiliates, was formed of taped highlights from the radio show with additional material unseen from his nightly E! show, including animated segments and exclusive behind the scenes footage. Following its debut on August 22, 1998, on 79 stations nationwide, the show began to lose affiliates after two episodes as local broadcasters became concerned with the risque content. By June 1999, the number of stations carrying the show had decreased to fifty-five. After three seasons, the final show aired on November 17, 2001, to around thirty stations. Stern reflected on the endeavor: "It was a weird thing. When I did the Channel 9 show we used to beat Saturday Night Live in New York ... I didn't think [the CBS show] was a good idea actually because [the radio show] was already running on the E! network. It was a mistake ... they ultimately wanted what the Channel 9 show was doing".

In the first Celebrity 100 list compiled by Forbes magazine in March 1999, Stern ranked at number 27 with an estimated $20 million earned that year. During the time of his CBS television show, Stern ventured into work as an executive producer through his production company for several television and film projects. In September 1999, the UPN network announced the production of Doomsday, an animated science-fiction comedy television series, for an initial thirteen episodes originally set to air in 2000. The series was described as: "Set in a post-apocalyptic America nearly destroyed by a freak radiation burst, [the show] follows the travels of the Bradley family as they cross the country in an RV looking for a new place to call home". Stern was to produce the series and voice Orinthal, the family's dog, but the show never made it to air. Stern's most successful executive production was Son of the Beach, a television parody sitcom of Baywatch that ran from March 2000 to October 2002 on FX. The show was not renewed for a fourth season.

On December 16, 2000, Stern's last live radio show of the year, he announced the signing of his new contract with Infinity Broadcasting to continue his show for five years after four months of negotiations. Forbes estimated his new earnings ranged between $17 million and $20 million a year. Stern spoke at The Concert for New York City in October 2001 in a hazmat suit with his buttocks exposed similarly to his 1992 MTV Music Video Awards appearance. In November 2001, Stern's production company had begun development on a weekly television sitcom titled Kane for CBS, originally intended to replace The Howard Stern Radio Show following its cancellation, with Ron Zimmerman as the writer of its pilot episode. Its premise followed "an oddball southern family and its strong-willed patriarch. The lead character's life is altered when his previously long-lost wife returns home to him and their group of eccentric children". The project was canceled before the filming stage. In late 2002, Stern acquired the rights to the comedy films Rock 'n' Roll High School (1979) and Porky's (1982) with Arclight Films. He expressed a wish to use a remake of the former as a launchpad for an unknown band. Under the deal, Stern was served as executive producer and was allowed to place "Howard Stern Presents" in the titles. He reasoned, "If I say to ... my audience, this is 'Howard Stern Presents', it means something to them ... it's going to be crazy. It means that it's going to be different, and they know I'm not going to be giving them any schlock". Development for Porky's came to a halt in 2011 following legal action regarding the ownership of the film's rights.

In March 2003, Stern filed a $100-million lawsuit against ABC, Telepictures and the producers of its reality television series Are You Hot?. He claimed its premise was copied from a radio show segment of his known as The Evaluators, whereby its staff and guests evaluate the bodies of contestants. Before the show aired, Stern was in talks of producing his version of the show. A settlement was reached five months later. In early 2004, Stern spoke of talks with ABC to host an hour television interview special as part of its Primetime series, but the project never came to fruition. In August 2004, cable channel Spike ordered thirteen episodes of Howard Stern: The High School Years, an animated series set during Stern's childhood that he was to executive produce. By late 2005, episode scripts and some test animation had been completed, but the project was soon shelved. Stern explained the series could have been produced "on the cheap" at $300,000 per episode, but the quality he demanded would have cost over $1 million each. Actor Michael Cera was cast as the lead voice. Stern also worked on a pilot with Robert Schimmel for The WB, based around the comedian's real-life experience of falling in love with his daughter's best friend following his battle with cancer, but was not picked up.

2004–2010: Signing with Sirius and terrestrial radio departure
The controversy surrounding the Super Bowl XXXVIII halftime show, aired live on February 1, 2004, led to the government's crackdown on indecency in radio and television following a surge in audience complaints. The situation prompted tighter control over content by station managers which made Stern feel "dead" creatively. After Clear Channel Communications and Viacom were fined for content the FCC deemed indecent, the situation culminated on October 6, 2004, when Stern announced the signing of a five-year deal with Sirius Satellite Radio, a subscription-based satellite radio service exempt from the FCC's broadcast regulations, starting in 2006. It was a move that has been regarded as the start of "a new era of radio". Stern's final live show on terrestrial airwaves aired on December 16, 2005.

Stern's first contract with Sirius was worth $500 million; a budget of $100 million a year for production, staff, and programming costs. In 2005, he formed two channels, Howard 100 and Howard 101, which launched in September, and formed Howard 100 News, a team of news reporters hired to report daily stories surrounding the radio show and those associated with it. Stern ended his eleven-year association with E! and secured a deal with the iN DEMAND network to launch Howard Stern On Demand, a digital cable video-on-demand service, to broadcast uncensored tapings of the Sirius radio show. The service was relaunched as HowardTV in March 2006 and lasted until it was discontinued in December 2013. A new, state-of-the-art studio and office space were constructed for the show at Sirius' headquarters in New York City. On January 9, 2006, the day of his first broadcast on Sirius, Stern and Buchwald received a total of 34.3 million shares of Sirius stock worth $218 million for exceeding agreed subscriber number targets set when the contract was signed. A second subscriber bonus was met in January 2007, and Stern received 22 million shares of stock worth $82.9 million. In 2006, Time magazine included Stern in its Time 100 list, who also ranked seventh on Forbes Celebrity 100 list in June 2006. When Sirius merged with rival service XM Satellite Radio in 2008 to form SiriusXM, the company paid Stern $25 million as per a clause in his contract. In 2006, Stern filed a trademark for the name "King of All Media".

On February 28, 2006, CBS Radio, formerly Infinity Broadcasting, filed a lawsuit against Stern, Buchwald, and Sirius, claiming that Stern misused CBS broadcast time to promote Sirius for unjust enrichment during his last fourteen months on terrestrial radio. Stern held a press conference hours before the suit was filed; he stressed to the media that the suit was nothing more than a "personal vendetta" against him by CBS president Leslie Moonves, and a distraction to the failure of the company's radio division in the aftermath of his departure from terrestrial radio as it struggled to attain ratings as strong as Stern's. A settlement was reached out of court in May 2006 which involved Sirius paying CBS $2 million for the rights to Stern's radio shows since 1985 as CBS initially prohibited Stern from playing them on Sirius.

2010–present: Sirius contract renewals, America's Got Talent, and third book
In December 2010, Stern renewed his contract with SiriusXM to continue his radio show for a further five years. His new deal allows him to work a reduced schedule from four to three live radio shows each week. On March 22, 2011, Stern and Buchwald filed a lawsuit against SiriusXM for $300 million, claiming further annual bonuses were not paid despite Stern meeting subscriber growth targets. On April 17, 2012, Judge Barbara Kapnick disagreed with their suit and dismissed it "with prejudice", thus preventing Stern and Buchwald from filing other suits over similar allegations against the company. The pair filed an appeal to the decision, but it was rejected by an appeal court.

By mid-2011, Stern had reduced his time playing chess and took up photography. Among his first shoots was taking layouts for Hamptons magazine in July. He continued to shoot throughout the year, including WHIRL magazine and the North Shore Animal League, and established his photography company Conlon Road Photography, a reference to the name of the road he lived on while growing up in Roosevelt.

Later in 2011, Stern announced his return to network television as a replacement for Piers Morgan as a judge on America's Got Talent for its seventh season. He had the show relocate to Radio City Music Hall in New York City to cater to his radio show schedule. Stern subsequently reappeared on the Forbes Celebrity 100 list at No. 26. He continued as a judge on the show for the eighth ninth and tenth seasons. Stern left at the end of the show's tenth season in September 2015 to devote more time to his radio show.

Stern was inducted into the National Radio Hall of Fame in 2012. He has been openly critical of the organization.

In August 2013, Stern and Simon Cowell shared first place on Forbes list of America's highest-paid television personalities with $95 million earned between June 2012–13. Stern and Cowell tied first place in the following year's poll with the same amount earned from June 2013–14. In 2015, Forbes placed Stern as the world's highest paid media personality and the fifth highest earning celebrity worldwide, at $95 million.

In February 2015, Whalerock Industries announced its partnership with Stern to set up a future direct-to-consumer digital "media hub" service, with a potential mix of free and subscription-based programming. On December 15, Stern announced his new deal with SiriusXM to continue his radio show for an additional five years. The agreement also gives Sirius the rights to his radio and video archives for an upcoming on-demand streaming application until 2027.

In April 2018, Stern inducted Bon Jovi into the Rock and Roll Hall of Fame.

In March 2019, Stern announced his third book for Simon and Schuster entitled Howard Stern Comes Again. It was released on May 14, 2019.

In May 2020, Stern admonished Trump supporters that listen to his SiriusXM show, saying President Trump despised his own supporters. In response to Stern's criticisms of Trump, Donald Trump Jr. tweeted video from the Miss Howard Stern New Year's Eve Pageant in which Stern parodied Ted Danson's Friars Club appearance by wearing blackface and repeatedly using the N-word and other racial slurs. Stern admitted, "The shit I did was fucking crazy" and that he has since toned down his show, crediting years in psychotherapy for his evolution.

In December 2020, Stern renewed his contract with SiriusXM, agreeing to produce his show for five more years.

In June 2022, Stern stated his interest in running for President in 2024, if Donald Trump becomes the Republican nominee.

FCC fines

Between 1990 and 2004, the Federal Communications Commission (FCC) fined owners of radio station licensees that carried The Howard Stern Show a total of $2.5 million for content it considered to be indecent.

Stern blamed the Bush administration for increased FCC fines and scrutiny of radio broadcasts in 2004 following the Super Bowl XXXVIII halftime show controversy that February, and that year began openly promoting John Kerry's presidential campaign and urged listeners to oust Bush.

Personal life
Stern met his first wife, Alison Berns, while at Boston University through a mutual friend. He featured Berns in a student film he made about Transcendental Meditation. Stern wrote, "Within a week after our relationship began, I knew I was going to marry her". They married at Temple Ohabei Shalom in Brookline, Massachusetts, on June 4, 1978; both were 24 years old. They have three daughters: Emily Beth (b. 1983), Debra Jennifer (b. 1986), and Ashley Jade (b. 1993). In October 1999, they decided to separate. Stern said, "I was totally neurotic and sort of consumed with work. I took work as the most important thing and the only thing". He moved from the home he shared with Berns in Old Westbury, New York into a 4,000-square-foot apartment in Millennium Tower in the Upper West Side of Manhattan which he bought in 1998 for $4.9 million. The marriage ended in 2001 with an amicable divorce and settlement. Stern has since bought a home in Southampton, New York on Long Island.

In the several months when Stern was single, he dated Angie Everhart and Robin Givens. He started seeing a psychotherapist. In 2000, he started to date model and television host Beth Ostrosky. He announced their engagement on his radio show on February 14, 2007. They married at Le Cirque restaurant in New York City on October 3, 2008. The ceremony was officiated by Mark Consuelos. In 2017, Stern purchased a home in Palm Beach, Florida, for $52 million.

In the early 1970s, Stern's parents began to practice Transcendental Meditation and encouraged him to learn. Stern credits the technique with helping him quit smoking, achieve his goals in radio, beat obsessive–compulsive disorder, and cure his mother of depression. As of 1997, he continued to practice it. Stern has interviewed Maharishi Mahesh Yogi, the founder of the technique, and thanked him for relieving his mother's depression.

Stern revealed his suffering with obsessive–compulsive disorder in Miss America. His condition originated while at university and continued into his radio career.

As part of the Staff Revelations Game on his radio show in January 2006, Stern revealed that he had undergone rhinoplasty and had liposuction under his chin in the 1990s.

Stern is a supporter and fund raiser for North Shore Animal League America. In 2012, Stern said he had adopted a pescetarian diet.

In 2019, Stern revealed that he had a cancer scare two years prior, after a growth was found on one of his kidneys. It turned out to be a benign cyst.

Stern and Ostrosky have been fostering cats in their Long Island home since 2014. Approximately 200 cats come through their home every year.

Filmography

Film

Home video

Television

Discography

Books

References

Sources

External links

 
 The Howard Stern Show on Sirius XM Radio
 
 
 

 
1954 births
American autobiographers
Jewish American male comedians
American male comedians
21st-century American comedians
American libertarians
American people of Austrian-Jewish descent
American people of Hungarian-Jewish descent
American people of Polish-Jewish descent
American talk radio hosts
American television talk show hosts
Boston University College of Communication alumni
Free speech activists
Jewish American male actors
Jewish American writers
Jewish male comedians
Living people
Male actors from New York City
New York (state) Libertarians
People from Jackson Heights, Queens
People from Rockville Centre, New York
People from the Upper West Side
People with obsessive–compulsive disorder
Photographers from New York (state)
Radio personalities from New York City
Shock jocks
Sirius Satellite Radio
Sirius XM
Television producers from New York City
Writers from Manhattan